Ronalee Ambrose Veitch  (née Chapchuk; born March 15, 1969) is a Canadian former politician who was interim leader of the Conservative Party and the leader of the Opposition between 2015 and 2017. She was the Conservative Party member of the House of Commons for Sturgeon River—Parkland between 2015 and 2017, and had previously represented Edmonton—Spruce Grove from 2004 to 2015.

In her first term as an Opposition MP, she was the Conservative Party's Intergovernmental Affairs critic. Ambrose also served as vice-chair of the Treasury Board and has held multiple cabinet positions as Canada's Minister of Health, Minister of the Environment, Minister of Intergovernmental Affairs, Minister of Western Economic Diversification, Minister of Labour, Minister of Public Works and Government Services, and Minister of Status of Women. She was President of the Queen's Privy Council for Canada. She is also a former communication consultant and public policy consultant for the Alberta government.

In May 2017, she announced her retirement from federal politics to take effect during the summer. The next day, she was named a visiting fellow by the Canada Institute at the Woodrow Wilson International Center for Scholars. She retired in July 2017, stating that she hoped she was "able to inspire women to consider public service."

In August 2017, Justin Trudeau's Liberal government appointed Ambrose to a 13-member NAFTA advisory council that would provide opinion and feedback on the negotiations with the United States and Mexico.

Early life and education
Ambrose was born Ronalee Chapchuk in Valleyview, Alberta, as the daughter of Colleen (née Clark) and James Chapchuk. She grew up in both Brazil and Parkland County, Alberta. In addition to English, she also speaks Portuguese and Spanish. Ambrose has a Bachelor of Arts in women's and gender studies from the University of Victoria and a Master of Arts degree in political science from the University of Alberta.

Political views
Ambrose is a feminist. Prior to her work in Canadian federal politics, Ambrose's community service included involvement with organizations working to end violence against women, including the Status of Women Action Group, the Victoria Sexual Assault and Sexual Abuse Crisis Centre, and the Edmonton Women's Shelter.

Ambrose also calls herself a libertarian and is a fan of Ayn Rand novels such as Atlas Shrugged and The Fountainhead. She was a member of the Trilateral Commission, an organization dedicated to closer cooperation between Europe, North America, and Japan.

Political career
Ambrose was first elected to Parliament in the 2004 federal election for the newly created riding of Edmonton-Spruce Grove in west Edmonton.

On February 16, 2005, she made headlines after making a remark in Parliament directed at Liberal Social Development Minister Ken Dryden in reference to the Liberal national child care plan: "working women want to make their own choices, we don't need old white guys telling us what to do".

Environment Minister 
In 2006 elections, Ambrose successfully defended her seat in Edmonton–Spruce Grove with 66.8% of the vote in the riding. She was then appointed Environment Minister in Prime Minister Stephen Harper's minority government. Ambrose's appointment to cabinet made her the youngest woman appointed to cabinet at the time.

On April 7, 2006, Ambrose announced that Canada had no chance of meeting its targets under the Kyoto Protocol and must set more realistic goals for cutting greenhouse gases. "My departmental officials and the department officials from natural resources have indicated that it is impossible, impossible for Canada to reach its Kyoto target. And let me be clear. I have been engaging with our international counterparts over the past month, and we are not the only country that is finding itself in this situation", said Ambrose.

On April 13, 2006, Ambrose stopped an Environment Canada scientist, Mark Tushingham, from speaking at the launch of his science fiction novel, Hotter than Hell, set in a dystopian future caused by global warming. Tushingham's publisher and environmentalists believed this was because the book was not in line with the government's views on climate change, but Ambrose's spokesperson said that the speech was billed as coming from an Environment Canada scientist speaking in official capacity and thus out of process.

On April 25, 2006, Ambrose expressed her support of the (now defunct) Asia-Pacific Partnership on Clean Development and Climate as an alternate to the Kyoto Protocol, because it includes China and India, two large polluting nations that are not bound by the latter agreement. The APP had voluntary emissions reduction targets and was focused on developing technological solutions to solving climate change.

In May 2006, Ambrose criticized the previous Liberal government's failure to meet the high targets that they had negotiated at Kyoto, saying, "We would have to pull every truck and car off the street, shut down every train and ground every plane to reach the Kyoto target the Liberals negotiated for Canada."

In June 2006, opposition discontent over Ambrose's actions as environment minister prompted the NDP and the Bloc Québécois to try to table a motion in the Commons environmental committee calling for her resignation. The motion was blocked with the help of the Liberals after the Conservatives said that the motion would be a confidence motion, that if passed would trigger an election in Fall 2006.

In August 2006 she stated, "I welcome the commitment from British Columbia to preserve and increase the population of Northern Spotted Owls ... It is my opinion that, given the measures they are taking, such as stopping logging in areas currently occupied by the owls, there is no imminent threat to the survival or recovery of the Northern Spotted Owl at this time."

On October 19, 2006, Ambrose introduced a Clean Air Act  that aimed to reduce the level of greenhouse emissions starting in 2020, cutting them to about half of the 2003 levels by 2050. She also introduced other regulations to industries and vehicles as well as a possible cooperation between the federal government and the provinces to create a system that would report air emissions. In an interview with the media, Ambrose denied that the Conservative government had withdrawn from the Kyoto Protocol despite its previous opposition to it. However, industries will have until 2010 before they are expected to reduce emissions, and the government will not have final (and voluntary) targets ready until 2020. Oil companies will have to reduce emissions on a per-barrel basis, reduction proportional to production basis.

Ambrose attended the November 2006 United Nations Climate Change Conference in Nairobi, Kenya.

A few weeks before Ambrose was shuffled out from the environment portfolio, she told a parliamentary committee that Canada had paid its debts under the Kyoto Protocol only to have an Environment Canada official point out that the bill was still unpaid.

Western Economic Diversification and Intergovernmental Affairs 
News stories began to appear in late 2006 of a possible Cabinet shuffle that included shifting Ambrose from her environment portfolio. As part of the January 4, 2007 cabinet shuffle, Ambrose was replaced as Environment Minister by John Baird and became Minister of Western Economic Diversification, Minister of Intergovernmental Affairs and President of the Queen's Privy Council for Canada.

Minister of Labour and Minister of Public Works and Government Services 
After winning reelection in the 2008 election, Ambrose was appointed Labour Minister on October 30, 2008. On January 19, 2010, Ambrose  succeeded Christian Paradis and was appointed as the new Minister of Public Works and Government Services where she introduced a major project to improve the way the government administers its pay and pension systems and "which will modernize service, introduce efficiencies, and improve our stewardship responsibilities in those areas." That system was to be the Phoenix Pay System.

Minister responsible for the Status of Women 
On April 9, 2010, Ambrose was also named Minister responsible for the Status of Women after Helena Guergis was dismissed from Cabinet.

The International Day of the Girl Child was formally proposed as a resolution by Canada in the United Nations General Assembly. Rona Ambrose, Canada's Minister for the Status of Women, sponsored the resolution; a delegation of women and girls made presentations in support of the initiative at the 55th United Nations Commission on the Status of Women. On December 19, 2011, the United Nations General Assembly voted to pass a resolution adopting October 11, 2012, as the inaugural International Day of the Girl Child.

On September 26, 2012, Ambrose voted in favour of Motion 312, a motion by Conservative MP Stephen Woodworth that would have directed a Commons committee to revisit the section of the Criminal Code defining at what point human life begins. Viewing the motion as an attempt to re-open debate on abortion laws, Canadian pro-choice groups and Commons opposition parties considered her vote inconsistent with her ministerial role and prompted a call for her resignation. The motion was eventually voted down.  Ambrose responded to her critics, stating her concern of discrimination against girls that is made possible by sex-selection abortion. Pro-Life groups praised Ambrose for supporting the Motion.

Minister of Health 

In July 2013, Stephen Harper appointed Rona Ambrose as Minister of Health and kept her as Minister of Western Economic Diversification.

While she was an MP, Ambrose worked closely with Nadia Murad, a Yazidi refugee and Nobel Peace Prize winner, in pushing the House of Commons to label the persecution of Yazidis a genocide. She also led the fight for a Canadian refugee program to bring Yazidi women and girls who have been sexually enslaved by ISIS to safety in Canada, which resulted in the rescue of over 1000 women and girls.

On June 11, 2015, she made headlines for being "outraged" that (in a unanimous decision) the Supreme Court of Canada expanded the definition of what constituted medical marijuana to include oils, teas, brownies, etc. from its previous limitation to dried leaves, arguing "Marijuana has never gone through the regulatory approval process at Health Canada, which requires rigorous safety reviews and clinical trials with scientific evidence".

When asked why the testing has not been done when people are taking medical marijuana every day, she responded, "It is not my job as Minister. If there is clinical evidence and a company decided ... to submit it to the regulatory approval process, it would be looked at. That has never happened."

Leader of the Opposition 
Stephen Harper resigned as Conservative party leader after the party was defeated by the Liberals in the 2015 election. Ambrose, who was elected in the new riding of Sturgeon River-Parkland—essentially the suburban portion of her old riding–announced that she would run for the interim leadership of the Conservative Party. She was elected to that post on November 5, 2015—becoming the third woman to hold the post.

Ambrose was the third female leader of Canada's major centre-right party. The first was former Prime Minister Kim Campbell who led Canada's now defunct Progressive Conservative Party of Canada, and the second was Deborah Grey, of the former Canadian Alliance. She is also the third woman to be Opposition Leader, after Grey and the NDP's Nycole Turmel. All three of them served in an interim capacity. Under the party constitution, as interim leader she was not eligible to run for the leadership at the subsequent Conservative Party of Canada leadership election.

On November 13, 2015, Ambrose responded to the terrorist attacks in Paris committed by the Islamic State of Iraq and the Levant. Ambrose stated, "The fight against ISIS (ISIL) requires a strong humanitarian response, but also a military response ... It's important that we remain resolute and support our allies."

Ambrose supports an inquiry into missing and murdered Indigenous women.

In February 2017, while still a sitting MP, Ambrose introduced Private Member's Bill C-337, An Act to amend the Judges Act and the Criminal Code, also known as the JUST Act. If passed, this bill would require judges in Canada to undergo training on sexual assault law, involving education on rape myths, stereotypes about victims, and the impact of trauma on memory. The JUST Act gained widespread support from experts and victim advocacy groups and was subsequently passed unanimously by the House of Commons. However, the bill did not pass third reading in the Senate, as the Senate rose for Summer 2019 without voting on the JUST Act, resulting in expiration on the order paper, as the order paper is wiped clean for the October 2019 federal election.

Resignation from Parliament 
In May 2017, Ambrose announced to her caucus that she would leave federal politics at the end of the spring session of Parliament, in June 2017, several weeks after her successor as Conservative leader is chosen. Her seat was held for the Conservatives by Dane Lloyd who won the by-election.

Post resignation 
Ambrose has stated that though she supports the merger of the Progressive Conservative Association of Alberta and the Wildrose Party, she will not be a candidate for the leadership of the proposed new United Conservative Party of Alberta.

She joined the Canada Institute at the Woodrow Wilson International Center for Scholars, a Washington, D.C. based think tank, as a visiting fellow focused on Canadian–American trade and to lead the organization's campaign to educate officials in both countries about the benefits of an integrated North American economy.

She was also appointed a member of the NAFTA advisory council set up by the Trudeau Liberal government in August 2017.

In 2018, Rona Ambrose and Laureen Harper, wife of former Canadian prime minister Stephen Harper, launched the She Leads Foundation. She Leads is a non-profit organization based in Alberta focused on encouraging women to run for office and participate in public life. Alongside UN Women, Ambrose assisted in the launch of SHEInnovates Alberta, a campaign providing tools necessary to encourage women to seek leadership positions and innovation.

In May 2020, it was announced that Rona Ambrose had joined the board of directors of the e-cigarette company Juul.

Following Andrew Scheer's resignation after the Conservative loss in the 2019 Canadian federal election, Ambrose faced pressure from many prominent Conservatives to run for party leader in the 2020 leadership race. Ambrose announced she would not run for party leader in January 2020, during a Facebook live stream in the Alberta mountains.

Personal life
Ambrose is married to J.P. Veitch, a private investment businessman and former rodeo bull rider. She was previously married to Bruce Ambrose from 1994 to 2011.

Honours
 She was sworn in as a member of the Queen's Privy Council for Canada on 6 February 2006. This gave her the Honorific Prefix "The Honourable" and the Post Nominal Letters "PC" for Life.
 In 2008, Ambrose was No. 17 on the Western Standard's "Liberty 100" top Canadian "pro-freedom activists, journalists, think-tankers and partisans".
 In 2012 She was awarded the Canadian version of the Queen Elizabeth II Diamond Jubilee Medal.

Scholastic

 Chancellor, visitor, governor, rector and fellowships

Memberships and Fellowships

Electoral record

References

External links

Official website

1969 births
21st-century Canadian women politicians
Canadian Ministers of Health
Canadian Ministers of the Environment
Canadian people of Ukrainian descent
Women members of the House of Commons of Canada
Women government ministers of Canada
Conservative Party of Canada MPs
Leaders of the Conservative Party of Canada
Leaders of the Opposition (Canada)
Living people
Members of the 28th Canadian Ministry
Members of the House of Commons of Canada from Alberta
Members of the King's Privy Council for Canada
University of Alberta alumni
University of Victoria alumni
Women in Alberta politics
Women opposition leaders